Charles Alfred Vigurs (11 July 1888 – 22 February 1917) was a British gymnast who competed in the 1908 Summer Olympics and in the 1912 Summer Olympics. He was born in Birmingham, West Midlands.

As a member of the British team in 1908 he finished eighth in the team competition. Four years later he was part of the British team, which won the bronze medal in the gymnastics men's team, European system event.

Vigurs was killed in action aged 28 during the First World War, serving as a private with the Royal Warwickshire Regiment near Grenay. He was buried in the Maroc British Cemetery nearby.

See also
 List of Olympians killed in World War I

References

External links
profile

1888 births
1917 deaths
Sportspeople from Birmingham, West Midlands
British male artistic gymnasts
Gymnasts at the 1908 Summer Olympics
Gymnasts at the 1912 Summer Olympics
Olympic gymnasts of Great Britain
Olympic bronze medallists for Great Britain
Royal Warwickshire Fusiliers soldiers
British military personnel killed in World War I
Olympic medalists in gymnastics
Medalists at the 1912 Summer Olympics
British Army personnel of World War I
Military personnel from Birmingham, West Midlands